Jocelyn is a 1933 French historical drama film directed by Pierre Guerlais and starring Samson Fainsilber,  Marguerite Weintenberger and Octave Berthier. It was remade in 1952. It is based on the 1836 novel of the same title by Alphonse de Lamartine set during the French Revolution.

Cast
 Samson Fainsilber as Jocelyn 
 Marguerite Weintenberger as Laurence  
 Octave Berthier as Le pâtre  
 Louis Rouyer as L'évéque  
 Jacqueline Carlier as Julie  
 Blanche Beaume as La mére

References

Bibliography 
 Crisp, Colin. Genre, Myth and Convention in the French Cinema, 1929-1939. Indiana University Press, 2002.

External links 
 

1933 films
1930s historical drama films
French historical drama films
Films set in the 18th century
1930s French-language films
French black-and-white films
1933 drama films
1930s French films